Paul Tang may refer to:
 Paul Tang (civil servant) (born 1958), Hong Kongese civil servant
 Paul Tang (politician) (born 1967), Dutch politician